The 53rd District of the Iowa House of Representatives in the state of Iowa.

Current elected officials
Sharon Steckman is the representative currently representing the district.

Past representatives
The district has previously been represented by:
 Alfred Nielsen, 1971–1973
 Frank A. Crabb, 1973–1983
 Janet A. Carl, 1983–1987
 Phillip E. Tyrrell, 1987–1993
 Philip Brammer, 1993–1997
 Kay Halloran, 1997–1999
 Dick Taylor, 1999–2003
 Dan Huseman, 2003–2013
 Sharon Steckman, 2013–present

References

053